Nead is an unincorporated community in Pipe Creek Township, Miami County, in the U.S. state of Indiana.

History
A post office was established at Nead in 1894, and remained in operation until 1901. The community was probably named for Samuel Nead, a local resident.

Nead was not officially platted. By 1914, Nead contained a public school and a general store, and around 40 inhabitants.

Geography

References

Unincorporated communities in Miami County, Indiana
Unincorporated communities in Indiana